General Authority for Roads, or Roads General Authority (RGA), is a regulatory authority under Saudi Arabia's Ministry of Transport and Logistic Services that is responsible for overseeing the country's construction, operation and maintenance of roads. It was established in accordance with the National Transport and Logistics Strategy by the Cabinet of Saudi Arabia in August 2022.

References 

Law of Saudi Arabia
Government agencies established in 2022